John Hollow is a valley in Stone County in the U.S. state of Missouri.

John Hollow has the name of John Davis, a pioneer citizen.

References

Valleys of Stone County, Missouri
Valleys of Missouri